The MTR, the rapid transit system of Hong Kong, encompasses 10 heavy rail lines and 98 stations as of May 2022. The following list sorts the stations according to their service line. In addition to the 98 metro stations listed on this page, the MTR system also consists of 68 light rail stops and one high-speed rail terminus in the city.

The current system was formed after the merger with the Kowloon–Canton Railway on 2 December 2007, when the operations of the East Rail line, the West Rail line, the Ma On Shan line and the Light Rail system were transferred to the MTR Corporation. Serving exclusively the northwestern New Territories, the light rail network comprises 12 routes, serving 68 stops. The network is being expanded and several new lines are being proposed.

East Rail line

Kwun Tong line

Tsuen Wan line

Island line

Tung Chung line

Airport Express

Tseung Kwan O line

Tuen Ma line

Disneyland Resort line

South Island line

Notes

See also

References

External links 
 MTR Route Map
 MTR – The Past

Hong Kong transport-related lists
Lists of metro stations

Railway stations in Hong Kong
Lists of railway stations in China